Horní Heřmanice is a municipality and village in Ústí nad Orlicí District in the Pardubice Region of the Czech Republic. It has about 400 inhabitants.

Administrative parts
Villages of Dolní Heřmanice and Rýdrovice are administrative parts of Horní Heřmanice.

References

External links

Villages in Ústí nad Orlicí District